The House of Carlo Goldoni, or in Italian, Casa di Carlo Goldoni is writer's house museum located in a small palace or palazzetto, that served as the residence of the Italian playwright Carlo Goldoni. Located in San Polo, Venice, it is now a museum and library of theater studies.

History
The small Gothic style palace is located on Calle dei Nomboli 2793. Originally property of the Rizzi family, the palace passed on till it was bought in the 17th century by the grandfather of Carlo Goldoni.

The House of Carlo Goldoni and Library of Theatre Studies (Casa di Goldoni e Biblioteca di Studi Teatrali) a museum managed by the Fondazione Musei Civici di Venezia which exhibits collections on Goldoni's life and works, as well as artefacts relating to Venetian theatre.

References

Museums established in 1931
Historic house museums in Italy
Literary museums in Italy
Museums in Venice
1931 establishments in Italy
San Polo
Carlo Goldoni